El bandido adolescente (The teenage bandit) is a 1965 novel written by Ramón J. Sender. He wrote it during a tour in New Mexico.

It is about the history of the gunfighter Billy the Kid. In this novel, Ramón J. Sender finds in Billy the Kid a Spanish kinship. He visited Mexico and there someone showed him the purported skull of Billy the Kid.

References

1965 novels
Spanish autobiographical novels
Spanish crime novels
Spanish historical novels
Cultural depictions of Billy the Kid
Works about Billy the Kid